The 1300s BC is a decade which lasted from 1309 BC to 1300 BC.

Events and trends
Cecrops II, legendary King of Athens, dies after a reign of 40 years and is succeeded by his son Pandion II. Pandion II was later driven into exile from Athens by the sons of Cecrops II's brother (or possibly nephew) Metion, so that Metion could take power. Pandion II fled to Megara, where he married the King's daughter and eventually inherited the throne. After his death, Pandion II's sons returned to Athens and drove out the sons of Metion.
c. 1307 BC—Adad-nirari I becomes king of Assyria.
1306 BC (or 1319 BC)—Horemheb becomes pharaoh of Ancient Egypt.
1300 BC—Pangeng moved the capital of Shang Dynasty to Yin.
c. 1300 BC—Some people of "Eastern Woodlands" begin to build massive earthworks, mounds of earth and stone. Poverty Point, Louisiana is the earliest one.
c. 1300 BC–1200 BC—Treasury of Atreus, Mycenae, Greece, is built. Excavated by Christos Stamatakis in 1878.
c. 1300 BC–1200 BC—The palace at Pylos is built.
c. 1300 BC–1100 BC—Warrior Vase, from Mycenae, Ancient Greece, is made. It is now at National Archaeological Museum of Athens.
c. 1300 BC-1200 BC Tollense valley battlefield takes place.
c. 1700 BC-1110 BC Indo-Aryan migration to South Asia from Central Asia, partly causing Harappans to migrate south.
c. 1300 BC-1250 BC Around this time, birth of king Rama may have taken place in kingdom of Kosala.

Significant people
 Pangeng of China

References